State Route 162 (SR 162) is a  state highway in the northwestern part of Wilcox County. The western terminus of the highway is an intersection with SR 5 in Kimbrough. The eastern terminus of the highway is at an intersection with SR 28 southeast of Prairie.

Route description
SR 162 begins at an intersection with SR 5 in Kimbrough. From this point, SR 162 generally travels in an easterly direction prior to taking a turn towards the northeast en route to its eastern terminus, an intersection with SR 28 southeast of Prairie.

Major intersections

See also

References

162
Transportation in Wilcox County, Alabama